Aleutian wild cattle are feral wild cattle found on the Alaskan Aleutian islands. Several attempts have been made to round up these cattle for ranching. In 1985–6 the cattle on the Shumagin Islands were eliminated by the U.S. Fish and Wildlife Service, but they still remained on Umnak Island and Chirikof Island

References

External links
 http://www.ars.usda.gov/is/pr/2008/080909.htm

Cattle breeds
Cattle breeds originating in the United States
Feral cattle